Daniel Lynn Dumoulin (born August 20, 1953) is a former Major League Baseball pitcher. He appeared in a total of eight games, all as a relief pitcher.

Sources

Major League Baseball pitchers
Cincinnati Reds players
Indianapolis Indians players
Trois-Rivières Aigles players
Tampa Tarpons (1957–1987) players
Billings Mustangs players
Baseball players from Indiana
1953 births
Living people
Sportspeople from Kokomo, Indiana